Auston English (born March 10, 1987) is a former American football defensive end.

On April 30, 2010, English was signed as an undrafted free agent by the Cleveland Browns.

On September 4, 2011, English was waived by the Cleveland Browns. On September 5, 2011, he was signed to the Browns' practice squad.

On August 3, 2013, English was signed by the Toronto Argonauts of the Canadian Football League. In 4 games with the Argonauts, English recorded 8 tackles.  English was released by the Argonauts on October 27, 2013.

References

External links
NFL profile
CFL profile
Cleveland Browns bio
 

1987 births
Living people
Players of American football from Texas
Cleveland Browns players
Hartford Colonials players
American football defensive ends
American football linebackers
Oklahoma Sooners football players
Toronto Argonauts players